Haskell is an architecture, engineering, construction and consulting firm headquartered in Jacksonville, Florida. It was founded by Preston Haskell in 1965. James O'Leary succeeded Steve Halverson as CEO in August, 2018.

Operations
Haskell's operations include architecture, construction and engineering for commercial and industrial facilities.

The company is headquartered in Jacksonville, Florida, with regional offices located in Atlanta, Georgia, Beloit, Wisconsin, Charlotte, North Carolina, Dallas, Texas, Denver, Colorado, Fort Myers, Florida, Irvine, California, Livermore, California, Madison, Wisconsin, Miami, Florida, Oklahoma City, Oklahoma, Salt Lake City, Utah, San Diego, California, St. Louis, Missouri, St. Paul, Minnesota, Tampa, Florida, Tulsa, Oklahoma, Mexico City, Mexico, Shanghai, China, Kuala Lumpur, Malaysia, Manila, Philippines, and Singapore.

Notable projects
Norwegian Cruise Line — Cruise Terminal B, PortMiami, Florida
Boynton Beach City Hall and Library, Boynton Beach, Florida
United Airlines Catering Kitchen, Newark, New Jersey
Ericsson USA 5G Smart Factory, Dallas, Texas
Wyoming Military Department General Instruction Building, Camp Guernsey, Wyoming
I-235 Broadway Widening at 50th Street & BNSF Railroad, Oklahoma City, Oklahoma
AnheuserBusch Jax Line 7, Jacksonville, Florida
MV-22 Hangar Marine Corps Air Station New River, Camp Lejeune, North Carolina
Spirit AeroSystems design and manufacturing building at Subang Airport, Kuala Lumpur, Malaysia
Scripps Proton Therapy Center, San Diego, California
Osprey Fountains Student Housing at University of North Florida, Jacksonville, Florida
Rolls-Royce jet-engine manufacturing plant, Prince George County, Virginia
Nike Distribution Center in Memphis, Tennessee
QTG Gatorade Distribution Center, Tolleson, Arizona
Gulfstream Aerospace Paint Hangar, Savannah, Georgia
Daytona International Speedway Infield Redevelopment, Daytona Beach, Florida
TIAA Bank Field, Jacksonville, Florida

Acquisitions
 September 2010: E²M, an Atlanta-based manufacturing system integration firm
 December 2012: H.R. Gray, a Columbus, Ohio-based firm
 January 2013: Seiberling, a Beloit, Wisconsin-based engineering and technical consulting company
 November 2014: FreemanWhite, a Charlotte-based consulting and design practice
 March 2016: Leidos Constructors, LLC, previously known as Benham, an Oklahoma City, OK-based design, engineering, and construction firm

Recognition and awards

 #1 Top Contractors in Manufacturing – Food & Beverage (2020, 2021) Engineering News Record
 #1 Green Industrial and Manufacturing Design Firm (2020, 2021) Engineering News Record
 #1 Top 5 GREEN Manufacturing & Industrial Contractors (2021) Engineering News Record
 #3 Aerospace Contractor (2021) Engineering News Record
 #3 Top 10 Design Firms (2021) Engineering News Record
 #6 Top 20 Contractors by Sector – Industrial (2021) Engineering News Record
 #6 Top Contractors in Manufacturing – Industrial Process (2021) Engineering News Record
 #4 Top 10 Environmental Firms – Air Quality/Clean Energy (2021) Engineering News Record
 #1 Top Contractor (2022) Jacksonville Business Journal
 Company of the Year (2019) - Construction Dive Awards

Company founder Preston Haskell received the Brunelleschi Lifetime Achievement Award in 2002 from the Design-Build Institute of America.

References

Companies based in Jacksonville, Florida
Privately held companies based in Florida
Construction and civil engineering companies of the United States
Construction and civil engineering companies established in 1965
Architecture firms based in Jacksonville
Brooklyn, Jacksonville
Multinational companies based in Jacksonville
1965 establishments in Florida